The German Army Aviation Corps is a special unit within the German Armed Forces (Bundeswehr). The German Army Aviation Corps is a branch of the German Army (Heer), containing all its helicopter units. The German Air Force and the German Navy both also have their own helicopter units.

Identification
The coat of arms of the German Army Aviation Corps depicts a white eagle, swooping down whilst carrying a sword in its claws. Members of the Army Aviation Corps wear a burgundy-coloured beret. The badge on the beret is a wing, crossed vertically by a sword, surrounded by oak leaves. The Waffenfarbe of the German Army Aviation Corps ( a means the German military uses to distinguish between different corps or troop functions in its armed services) is silver-grey. The epaulettes of members of the German Army Aviation corps are lined in silver-grey. The gorget patches are held in the same color with two vertical cords. The sleeves of the uniforms display the flying wings, emphasising their main task.

Tasks
The main tasks of the Army Aviation Corps are:
 support of own troops through anti-tank warfare.
 transport, both internally and externally, of personnel and material.
 reconnaissance in combination with other units.
 liaison between different units
 disaster relief, e.g. forest fires, floods etc.

Due to their manifold tasks, the German Army Aviation Corps cannot be classified as having any of the classic tasks of army units, namely leading and supporting the leadership, fighting and supporting the fighting force.

Most units of the Army Aviation Corps are incorporated into the Airmobile Operations Division (Division Luftbewegliche Operationen). This division was founded on 1 July 2002 and became operational on 8 October 2002.

History

After the foundation of the Bundeswehr in 1955, the first head of the department of the German Army Aviation Corps, Colonel Horst Pape, was appointed on 7 November 1956.
During the next ten years, a great number of bases all over the territory of the Federal Republic of Germany were founded.

In the first instance, all the equipment was acquired from allied nations. However, from the late 1960s onwards, more emphasis was put on developing new technology with other European partners. Until 1990, the German Army Aviation Corps was restricted to see active service only during aid mission within Germany and NATO countries.

Since the unification of the Federal Republic of Germany with the German Democratic Republic in 1990, there have been several rounds of re-organizations within the Bundeswehr, also affecting the German Army Aviation Corps. A number of bases were closed down, and their units either dissolved or merged with other units. In 2002, most remaining units of the German Army Aviation Corps were incorporated into the Airmobile Operations Division (Division Luftbewegliche Operationen) .

Furthermore, the role of the German Army Aviation Corps changed as well. Since the mid-1990s, it has been increasingly deployed in a support rôle in several countries for as varying bodies as the United Nations, NATO and the EU, first in Iraq after the 1st Gulf War, then on the Balkans with IFOR, KFOR, SFOR and EUFOR, and most recently in Afghanistan as part of ISAF and most recently in the Democratic Republic of the Congo as part of EUFOR RD Congo to support the UN mission MONUC to monitor the general elections in 2006. This mission began in June 2006 and ended with the last soldiers returning in December of the same year.

In October 2011 the German Federal Ministry of Defence announced a reorganisation/reduction of the German Armed Forces. As a consequence, the strength of Germany Army Aviation Corps will be reduced. Flying operations at a number of air bases will cease to exist and the respective units being dissolved. Other units will be transferred to the German Air Force.

Equipment

The German Army Aviation Corps is equipped with:
 Airbus H145 LUH SAR, Search and Rescue helicopter.
 Eurocopter EC135, training helicopter.
 NH90, multi-role helicopter
 Eurocopter Tiger, attack helicopter

Units
The following units were subordinate to Airmobile Operations Division, the division's headquarters being in Veitshöchheim:

The following units were part of Airmobile Brigade 1 of Airmobile Operations Division. The division's headquarters was in Fritzlar:

The following unit was not part of the Airmobile Operations Division but part of Air Transport Wing 62:

The following units operated independently:

The following units are or were part of the Army Aviation School. The school's headquarters is in Bückeburg:

See also
 History of the Army Aviation Corps (Germany)
 Army aviation

References

Further reading

External links 
  Official site of the German Army Aviation Corps 
 Day of the German Army Aviators 2006 
 Site of Army Aviation Liaison and Reconnaissance Helicopter Squadron 100  
 Helicopter museum in Bückeburg

Army aviation units and formations
German army aviation
Military administrative corps of Germany
Military units and formations established in 1957
Units and formations of the German Army (1956–present)